"Light Years Away" is a song recorded by Hong Kong singer-songwriter G.E.M. released on 30 December 2016. It is the Chinese theme song for the American sci-fi film Passengers. The music video for the song is the first by a Hong Kong artist to reached 100 million views on YouTube. It is also the twelfth Chinese music video to reach 100 million views and the fastest music video by a Chinese female singer to reach 100 million views on YouTube.

On 17 March 2019, it has become the most viewed Chinese music video among female singers on YouTube, with a view count of over 177M. The song reached 250 million views on YouTube by October of 2022.

Background 
She was invited to write the song because of her influence in China and her songwriting skill. After she watched few scenes of the film, she was touched by the love between the two characters. She then wrote different demos and chose this as the final work.

Commercial live performances 
 2016–2017 HunanTV New Year Concert
 Tencent Myapp Internet Festival (2017-01-13)
 Weibo Film Gala (2017-06-18)
 2017 Migu Music Awards (2017-12-16)
 KKBox Music Awards (21 January 2018)
 Singer 2018 (2018-04-13) (collaborate with Hua Chenyu)
 2019 Breakthrough Prize (5 November 2018)

Music video 
The music video captures scenes from the film Passengers, and G.E.M. is singing in the Avalon. The music video starts with G.E.M. standing alone in the Avalon, then intersperses the scenes of Jennifer Lawrence and Chris Pratt taken from the film, such as dancing together, playing games, watching films, etc. At the end, it shows the sleeper ship out of control and uses special effects to imitate giant spherical water flow caused by weightlessness.

Breakthrough Prize Performance 
On 4 November 2018, G.E.M. performed "Light Years Away" live at the Seventh Annual Breakthrough Prize at the NASA Ames Research Center in Silicon Valley.

References 

G.E.M. songs
2016 songs